Iron River is an unincorporated, census-designated place located in the town of Iron River, Bayfield County, Wisconsin, United States.

U.S. Highway 2 serves as a main route in the community. Other routes include County Highways A and H.

Iron River has a post office with ZIP code 54847.

As of the 2010 census, its population was 761.

Iron River is the home of the Bayfield County Fair. The Fair takes place annually in August.

References

Census-designated places in Bayfield County, Wisconsin
Census-designated places in Wisconsin